Saxinis omogera is a species in the family Chrysomelidae ("leaf beetles"), in the order Coleoptera ("beetles").
The distribution range of Saxinis omogera includes Central America and North America.

References

Further reading
 American Beetles, Volume II: Polyphaga: Scarabaeoidea through Curculionoidea, Arnett, R.H. Jr., M. C. Thomas, P. E. Skelley and J. H. Frank. (eds.). 2002. CRC Press LLC, Boca Raton, Florida.
 
 Peterson Field Guides: Beetles, Richard E. White. 1983. Houghton Mifflin Company.
 Riley, Edward G., Shawn M. Clark, and Terry N. Seeno (2003). "Catalog of the leaf beetles of America north of Mexico (Coleoptera: Megalopodidae, Orsodacnidae and Chrysomelidae, excluding Bruchinae)". Coleopterists Society Special Publication no. 1, 290.

Clytrini
Beetles described in 1848